Wells Fargo Arena is a multi-purpose arena in Des Moines, Iowa, United States. Part of the Iowa Events Center, the arena opened on July 12, 2005, at a cost of $117 million. Named for title sponsor Wells Fargo, the arena replaced the aging Community Choice Credit Union Convention Center as the Des Moines area's primary venue for sporting events and concerts.

Wells Fargo Arena seats 15,181 people for hockey and arena football games, 16,110 for basketball games, and as many as 16,980 for concerts. It also features The Fort Restaurant, which provides views of the Des Moines River and the Iowa State Capitol. The restaurant opened on October 6, 2005, coinciding with the Iowa Stars' inaugural home game.

The arena is also connected to the rest of the Iowa Events Center as well as downtown Des Moines through the city's Skywalk system.

Usage
The first event held at the arena was Tony Hawk's Boom-Boom Huck Jam, on July 1. Its first concert, featuring Tom Petty and the Heartbreakers with The Black Crowes, was held on July 18.

Wells Fargo Arena is home to the Iowa Wolves (formerly named the Iowa Energy) of the NBA G League, the Iowa Barnstormers of the Indoor Football League and the Iowa Wild of the American Hockey League.

From 2005 until 2009, Wells Fargo Arena served as the home of the American Hockey League's Iowa Chops. The arena is notable for hosting the inaugural game of the reincarnation of the Arena Football League on April 2, 2010, between the Barnstormers and Chicago Rush, televised nationally by NFL Network. 

It was the host for the first and second Round games for the 2008 NCAA Division I women's basketball tournament and served as a regional site 2012 tournament. In 2013, it hosted the NCAA Wrestling Team Championship.

It has hosted the state high school wrestling and basketball tournaments since 2006 and the Big Four Classic, a doubleheader featuring the state's four men's Division I teams, since 2012.

The arena hosted the 2011 NBA D-League Finals, which saw the Iowa Energy win their first title on their home court and set the D-League attendance record with 14,036 fans in the arena for Game 2.

In 2016, the arena hosted first and second-round games for the Men's NCAA basketball tournament after having failed on several prior bids. The NCAA Men's basketball tournament returned to Wells Fargo Arena in 2019, hosting the tournament's first and second round from March 21 to 23. The tournament returned yet again in 2023, hosting national powers Kansas and Texas.

In 2020, the arena gained a temporary second hockey tenant when the Des Moines Buccaneers announced plans to begin their season downtown after damage to their home arena during the August 2020 Midwest derecho. The Buccaneers returned to their previous arena in January 2021.

Tenants

Current tenants
Iowa Wild of the AHL, affiliate of the NHL's Minnesota Wild
Iowa Wolves of the NBA G League, affiliate of the NBA's Minnesota Timberwolves
Iowa Barnstormers of the IFL

Former tenants
Iowa Stars of the AHL; the team operated from 2005 to 2008 as the Iowa Stars (affiliate of the NHL's Dallas Stars) and in 2008–09 as the Iowa Chops (affiliate of the NHL's Anaheim Ducks).

Events
 Slipknot: from Des Moines 2009 & 2016; played their song "Iowa"
 Tony Hawk's Boom Boom Huck Jam: 2005
 Paul McCartney: 2005 & 2017
 Garth Brooks: 6 sold-out shows (April - May, 2016)
 The Des Moines Register Sports Awards, held annually from 2017-2019
 NCAA Wrestling National Championship: 2013
 Green Day: 2005, 2017
 WWE Raw & Smackdown Live!
 The Eagles: 2018
 Tom Petty & The Heartbreakers: 2016
 Foo Fighters: November, 2017
 Drake: 2016
 NCAA Men's Basketball First & Second Rounds: 2016, 2019, 2023
 The Chainsmokers: 2017
 Red Hot Chili Peppers: 2017
 Boston: 2016
 Eric Church: 2018
 Chris Stapleton: 2017
 Hall & Oates: 2017
 NCAA Women's Volleyball Championships: 2016
 Justin Moore & Lee Brice: 2017
 Journey & Def Leppard: 2018
 Fall Out Boy: 2016 & 2018
 Shania Twain: 2015 & 2018
 Tool: 2019
 Twenty One Pilots: 2019
 Taylor Swift: 2009, 2011, 2013 & 2015
 Cardi B: 2019
 For King & Country: 2021
 Elton John: Farewell Tour 2022
 Justin Bieber: 2010, 2013, 2016 & 2022

References

External links

Wells Fargo Arena Information

Convention centers in Iowa
Indoor ice hockey venues in the United States
NBA G League venues
Basketball venues in Iowa
Sports venues in Greater Des Moines
Iowa Stars
Iowa Wild
Sports in Des Moines, Iowa
Buildings and structures in Des Moines, Iowa
Iowa Energy
Tourist attractions in Des Moines, Iowa
2005 establishments in Iowa
Sports venues completed in 2005
Iowa Wolves
Indoor arenas in Iowa